Esmans is a commune in the Seine-et-Marne department in the Île-de-France region in north-central France.

Demographics
Inhabitants of Esmans are called Esmanais.

History
the history of esmans begins in the Gallo-Roman era. In the Middle Ages Esmans is the property of the abbey of Saint-Germain-des-Prés. Several kings stayed in Esmans: Louis VII in 1139–1140, Louis VIII in 1225, Louis IX Saint Louis in 1255, and Philip IV in 1302. Guillaume Briçonnet the Bishop of Meaux will be buried in the church in 1534.

See also
Communes of the Seine-et-Marne department

References

External links

1999 Land Use, from IAURIF (Institute for Urban Planning and Development of the Paris-Île-de-France région) 

Communes of Seine-et-Marne